Coach may refer to:

Guidance/instruction
 Coach (sport), a director of athletes' training and activities
 Coaching, the practice of guiding an individual through a process
 Acting coach, a teacher who trains performers

Transportation

 Coach (bus), an automotive vehicle for long-distance travel
Coach (carriage), a horse-drawn vehicle
Coach (passenger car), a type of railroad car
 Coach (scheduled transport), the mode of transport using such vehicles
Coach Canada, a Canadian bus transport company
 Coach USA, an American bus transport company
 Coach class, a category of transport seating
 Ehroflug Coach II S, a Swiss ultralight aircraft design
 Funeral coach, a vehicle for carrying the deceased

Business
Coach, Inc. (now Tapestry, Inc.), the parent company of Coach New York and other fashion brands
Coach New York (aka Coach), an American company specializing in luxury accessories such as handbags

Art, media, and entertainment

Characters
 Coach (comics), a Marvel Comics character
 Coach Ernie Pantusso, a Cheers character
 Coach, a Left 4 Dead 2 character
 Coach (New Girl), a character from the sitcom New Girl.

Film
 Coach (1978 film), starring Cathy Lee Crosby
 Coach (2018 film), a Russian sports film directed by Danilan Kozlovsky

Television
 Coach (TV series), an American television sitcom, 1989–1997

People
 The Coach (born 1972), American professional wrestling personality
 Coach, alias of American professional wrestler John Tolos during a short 1991 stint as a WWF manager
 Benjamin "Coach" Wade (born 1971), a Survivor contestant

Other uses
 Zoran COACH, a line of digital cameras from Zoran Corporation
 The Coach (horse)
Coach (Rec Room Unknown Announcer)

See also

 Bus (disambiguation)
 Coachbuilder
 Horse-drawn omnibus (coach)
 Ronny Coaches (fl. 1998–2013), Ghanaian musician
 Stagecoach